La Casa de Madame Lulù is a black and white 1968 Argentine comedy directed by Julio Porter.

Cast
 Libertad Leblanc as Maria La Pompadour
 Juan Carlos Altavista as Pepe
 Alberto Anchart as Renzo
 Elvia Andreoli (credited as Elvia Evans)
 Santiago Bal
 Osvaldo Canónico
 Tita Coello
 Hugo Dargo
 Jorge De La Riestra
 Maurice Jouvet
 Elena Lucena as Madame Lulú
 Lalo Malcolm
 Tino Pascali
 Fidel Pintos
 Vicente Rubino as President Liga de Moralidad
 Susana Rubio
 Tristán
 Gloria Ugarte
 Emilio Vidal
 Enzo Viena as Pichoncito Fontana

External links

 

1968 films
Argentine comedy films
1960s Spanish-language films
1960s Argentine films